Stanley Joseph Galle (February 7, 1919 – January 28, 2006) was a third baseman in Major League Baseball. He played for the Washington Senators in 1942.

References

External links

1919 births
2006 deaths
Major League Baseball third basemen
Washington Senators (1901–1960) players
Baseball players from Milwaukee
Ada Herefords players
Minor league baseball managers